"Rich Boy" is a song by Swedish electronic music duo Galantis, featuring uncredited vocals from 8-year-old girl Ava Rifat and Australian singer-songwriter Chiara Hunter which makes them both sing the same over and over. It was released on 17 February 2017.

Track listing

Charts

Release history

References 

2017 songs
2017 singles
Songs written by Henrik Jonback
Songs written by Karen Poole
Songs written by Freedo (producer)
Songs written by Style of Eye